David Wharnsby (born June 20, 1967) is a Canadian film editor. He was married to director and actress Sarah Polley.

Life and career
Wharnsby was born in Waterloo, Ontario. He attended Kitchener-Waterloo Collegiate and Vocational School.

Some of Wharnsby's numerous credits include; the CBC's miniseries Northern Town, directed by Gary Burns; At The Hotel, directed by Ken Finkleman; TIFF top ten films, I, Claudia, by Chris Abraham; The Uncles by Jim Allodi; Ken Finkleman's The Newsroom and Foreign Objects; I Shout Love by Sarah Polley; Atom Egoyan's Sarabande; The Four Seasons and Don Giovanni Unmasked by Barbara Willis Sweete; David Weaver's Siblings and Century Hotel; and Three Stories by Semi Chellas.

His television directing credits include one episode of Billable Hours ("Killer Comma"), two episodes of Being Erica ("This Be the Verse" and "The Unkindest Cut") and three episodes of Saving Hope.

Wharnsby received a Gemini Award for his work on Jennifer Baichwal's documentary The Holier It Gets. He has also worked with Baichwal on The True Meaning of Pictures, and the Let It Come Down: The Life of Paul Bowles. He won a Genie Award in 2004 for his work on Guy Maddin's The Saddest Music in the World.  Wharnsby was also awarded the DGC Craft Award for Picture Editing of a Feature Film for Away from Her in 2007.  Regardless of the myriad of awards he has been nominated for and/or received, he has rarely made any public appearances.

Wharnsby married Sarah Polley, who in addition to directing is an actress, singer, writer, and activist, in September 2003. They have since divorced. He collaborated with then wife Polley on the 2006 feature-length film Away from Her, which Polley directed. His mother Marnie was host of the children's television show Romper Room in the 1960s for CKCO-TV.  His brother Tim is a sports reporter for the Canadian Broadcasting Corporation's website, cbcsports.ca.  He also has two sisters.

Filmography

References

External links

1967 births
People from Waterloo, Ontario
Canadian film editors
Best Editing Genie and Canadian Screen Award winners
Living people